Okposo is a surname of Nigerian origin. Notable people with the surname include:

Kyle Okposo (born 1988), American ice hockey player
Sammie Okposo (1971–2022), Nigerian Gospel singer

Surnames of Nigerian origin